San Juan de Mata is a district of the Turrubares canton, in the San José province of Costa Rica.

Geography 
San Juan de Mata has an area of  km² and an elevation of  metres.

Demographics 

For the 2011 census, San Juan de Mata had a population of  inhabitants.

Transportation

Road transportation 
The district is covered by the following road routes:
 National Route 137
 National Route 319

References 

Districts of San José Province
Populated places in San José Province